Edwin Chukwuemeka Okonta was a Nigerian highlife musician who was prominent in the highlife scene during the late 1950s and the 60s. Prior to branching out on his own, he was an apprentice under Sammy Akapabot and later played with Bobby Benson's band.

Discography

Singles
 "Otanjele" (Sweet Banana)
 "Asili"
 "Oriwo"
 "Kelewele"
 "Anyidi"
 "Ejenelulo"
 "Okokoko"
Abele

References

Nigerian male musicians
1935 births
Living people